was a Japanese painter. He taught part-time in Taiwan at the University of Taipei and as full-time instructor at the Taiwan Mandarin Institute. He promoted modern western art education in Taiwan and was considered a pioneer of art education. In Taiwan, he initiated the art and culture monthly meeting and the tea party (1913–1916). He came to Taiwan to actively promote watercolor paintings in schools and off-campus, through platforms such as the Taiwan Daily News and Taiwan Times. He published paintings and articles "The Latest Watercolor Painting Method", "Extracurricular Painting Posts", "Mountain Purple Water Ming" and directed the Seven Star Painting Society, the Taiwan Watercolor Painting Society, the Keelung Asian Painting Association, as well as school art workshops and courses for amateurs. In the 1920s Taiwan's painting circles included Lee Shih-chiao, Huang Yibin (黄奕滨), Li Mei-shu, Ni Jianghuai (倪蒋怀), Ran In-ting and Lee Tze-fan.

Ishikawa advocated for the Taiwanese government to hold a sponsored art exhibition and found the Taiwan Fine Arts Exhibition. Taiwan has a tradition of running a competitive art exhibition where Ishikawa served as an examiner. This tradition has continued for more than eighty years and is regarded as a symbol of the important work and modernization of the government's culture and art sectors.

Biography

Early life
Ishikawa Kinichiro was born on 8 August 1871, in Shizuoka, Japan. He was a watercolor painter of Taiwanese Western art education and visited Japanese-era Taiwan to study. He is recognized as one of the torchbearers of modern Taiwanese Western art. His father was a former official of the Tokugawa government during the bakumatsu (late Tokugawa Shogunate). He was infatuated with painting, but his father did not approve of his artistic pursuits.

Education
In 1888, he entered the Tokyo Telecommunications School of the Ministry of Communications. In order to sustain his interest in painting, aside from using prints of English works to engage in self-study, he also studied Western paintings under Shoudai Tameshige. In 1889, he entered the Ministry of Finance’s Printing Department and joined the Meiji Fine Art Society. He traveled, with the English watercolor painter Alfred East (1849-1913) acting as his Japanese language translator, and this experience inspired his interest in watercolors. By 1906, he began to publish essays in the watercolor magazine "Mizue" (Water Painting). He began to teach watercolor painting in Taiwan in 1906.

Work and public life

Due to his proficiency in the English language and his painting ability, Ishikawa worked as an official translator of the Imperial Japanese Army General Staff Office. In 1900, he left for China as a result of the Boxer Rebellion and, from 1904 to 1905, he was stationed in Manchuria during the Russo-Japanese War. While engaged at various military posts, he had several opportunities to draw battlefield scenes.

In 1907, he visited Taiwan for the first time as a military translator for the Taiwan Governor-General’s Office. From 1910 onwards, he served as an instructor at Taiwan Governor-General's National Language School’s Painting Division. In 1913, he organized other Japanese literati in Taiwan to form the Bancha Society  and promote cultural activities in Taiwan.

By 1916, he resigned his teaching position and returned to Japan to paint en plein air while traveling and hosting exhibitions. In 1922, he fulfilled a longstanding wish, traveling to Europe and painting en plein air at places like Paris, London, Rome and Venice. In 1923, his home in Kamakura was destroyed during the Great Kantō earthquake, indefinitely shutting down his art activities.

In 1924, at the invitation of Taipei Normal School’s Dean Shihota Syōkichi, Ishikawa returned to Taiwan to teach once again. He continued teaching in Taiwan until his retirement in 1932, and then went back to Japan. During Ishikawa’s second sojourn in Taiwan, he actively promoted watercolor and fine art activities.

Contributions to art
Aside from teaching formal classes, he also organized and led en plein air painting field trips on holidays. He advised several art groups, such as the Chi-Hsing Painting Society, Taiwan Watercolor Painting Society, Keelung Asia Art Society, and Taiwan Painting Studio. In addition, along with other artists such as Shiotsuki Toho and Gohara Koto, he participated in the planning and judging of the 1st Taiwan Art Exhibition (Taiten). He published articles and works in publications. He also published Scenic Beauties Collection and Extracurricular Painting Guides.

His contributions to the promotion and development of Taiwan art education were held in high esteem. Students like Ni Chiang-huai, Huang Yi Bin, Lan Yinding, Li Chefan and Chen Zhiqi, received help and inspiration from Ishikawa. Ishikawa Kinichiro traveled throughout Taiwan to compose en plein air paintings and his works depict the natural scenery and historical monuments of the island. His brushwork was light and agile, colors were bright and appealing and he had a distinctive style of capturing pastoral scenes in a romantic, nostalgic atmosphere. Taiwan's Acacia, Zhantan trees (Melia azedarach) and old houses were often the subjects of his paintings.

See also
Taiwanese art

References

Footnotes

Citations

External links

 Kinichiro Ishikawa Artworks
 Starting Out from 23.5°N: Chen Cheng-po, Academia Sinica Digital Center (ASDC)

Taiwanese painters
1871 births
1945 deaths
Artists from Shizuoka Prefecture
20th-century Japanese painters